The Zusailing Formation is located in Baoting County, Hainan Province, China. It contains carbonaceous phyllite with interbeds of crystalline limestone. Its dated to the late Silurian Period.

References

Silurian System of Asia
Geologic formations of China
Geology of Hainan